Alex Beever (born 5 September 1973) is a British rower. She competed in the women's eight event at the 2000 Summer Olympics.

References

External links
 

1973 births
Living people
British female rowers
Olympic rowers of Great Britain
Rowers at the 2000 Summer Olympics
Sportspeople from Oxford
World Rowing Championships medalists for Great Britain